More Perfect is a podcast about American history and politics provided by WNYC Studios. Its first three seasons were hosted by Jad Abumrad. In July 2022, WNYC Studios announced it would return in 2023.

Background 
The podcast debuted on June 2, 2016 with an episode entitled "Cruel and Unusual", which was dedicated to the legal history of the death penalty in the United States. The podcast is a spinoff of Radiolab that delves into the history of decisions made by the Supreme Court. Elie Mystal is the legal editor for the podcast.

On July 14, 2022, WNYC Studios announced that it would return "next year" with host Julia Longoria.

27: The Most Perfect Album 
The podcast's third season was built around 27: The Most Perfect Album, an album dedicated to the Constitution of the United States, with at least one song about each of its amendments. Kevin Morby did the 24th amendment. Torres did the 5th amendment.

Reception 
The Atlantic included the podcast on their list of "The 50 Best Podcasts of 2016". In 2016, Business Insider listed the podcast as one of "The 50 Best Podcasts for Tech, Science, Entertainment, and Politics". The New Yorker listed the podcast as one of the "Best Podcasts of 2017".

The show won the 2018 Webby award for "Best Sound Design/ Original Music Score".

References

External links 

 

Law podcasts
WNYC Studios programs
2016 podcast debuts
American podcasts